Saville Esmé Percy (8 August 1887 – 17 June 1957) was an English actor who specialized in the plays of G.B. Shaw and appeared in 40 films between 1930 and 1956. He was born in London and died in Brighton.

Partial filmography

 Murder! (1930) - Handel Fane
 The Lucky Number (1932) - The Chairman
 Bitter Sweet (1933) - Hugh Devon
 Summer Lightning (1933) - Baxter
 On Secret Service (1933) - Bleuntzli - Reporter
 Love, Life and Laughter (1934) - Goebschen
 Nell Gwynn (1934) - Samuel Pepys
 Lord Edgware Dies (1934) - Duke of Merton
 Unfinished Symphony (1934) - Huettenbrenner
 Regal Cavalcade (1935) - Lloyd George
 It Happened in Paris (1935) - Pommier
 Abdul the Damned (1935) - Ali - Chief Eunuch
 Invitation to the Waltz (1935) - Napoleon Bonaparte
 The Invader (1936) - Jose
 The Amateur Gentleman (1936) - John Townsend
 A Woman Alone (1936) - General Petroff
 Song of Freedom (1936) - Gabriel Donozetti
 Land Without Music (1936) - Austrian Ambassador
 Crime Over London (1936) - (uncredited)
 Accused (1936) - Morel
 Jump for Glory (1937) - Robinson
 The Frog (1937) - Philo Johnson
 Our Fighting Navy (1937) - Diego de Costa
 The Return of the Scarlet Pimpernel (1937) - Sheridan, the playwright
 Pygmalion (1938) - Count Aristid Karpathy
 21 Days (1940) - Henry Wallen
 Jeannie (1941)
 Hi Gang! (1941) - Lord Chamberlain
 The Young Mr. Pitt (1942) - Minor Role (uncredited)
 Dead of Night (1945) - Antique Dealer (segment "The Haunted Mirror")
 Caesar and Cleopatra (1945) - Major Domo
 Lisbon Story (1946) - Mariot
 The Ghosts of Berkeley Square (1947) - Vizier

Radio drama
"Appointment With Fear" episode The Speaking Clock (13 April 1944), where he lent his very distinctive, rich voice to the character of Mr. Markham the Antique Dealer, as well as his twin brother.
Eurydice (1951) Radio adaptation of a play by Anouilh. Music by John Hotchkis. Cast: Paul Scofield, Esmé Percy, David Peel, Denise Bryer, Sebastian Cabot, others. BBC R3, Broadcast 05/02/1951. (The British Library National Sound Archive, Find Format: T11629WR C1)
The Duchess of Malfi (1954) Radio adaptation of the classic tragedy. Percy plays the evil Cardinal, brother to ferile Ferdinand (Paul Scofield and the Duchess (Peggy Ashcroft) BBC R3, Broadcast May, 1954.
Henry VIII (1954) Radio adaptation of the Shakespeare play presented in honour of Sybil Thorndike's Golden Jubilee in the theatre. Cast: Sybil Thorndike, Robert Donat, Ralph Richardson, Vivien Leigh, Ernest Thesiger, Esmé Percy, John Gielgud, Laurence Olivier, Paul Scofield and others. BBC R3, Broadcast 14/06/1954.

References

External links

1887 births
1957 deaths
English male film actors
English male silent film actors
Male actors from London
20th-century English male actors
English male radio actors